Duleh or Dowleh, also rendered as Doleh, may refer to:
 Dowleh, Kermanshah
 Doleh Yaraleh, Khuzestan Province
 Duleh, Razavi Khorasan
 Duleh, West Azerbaijan
 Duleh-ye Garm, West Azerbaijan Province
 Duleh, Zanjan